Asplenium platyneuron (syn. Asplenium ebeneum), commonly known as ebony spleenwort or brownstem spleenwort, is a fern native to North America east of the Rocky Mountains. It takes its common name from its dark, reddish-brown, glossy stipe and rachis (leaf stalk and midrib), which support a once-divided, pinnate leaf. The fertile fronds, which die off in the winter, are darker green and stand upright, while the sterile fronds are evergreen and lie flat on the ground. An auricle at the base of each pinna points towards the tip of the frond. The dimorphic fronds and alternate, rather than opposite, pinnae distinguish it from the similar black-stemmed spleenwort.

The species was first described in 1753 by Linnaeus as Acrostichum platyneuros, although Linnaeus' type drew on material from several other species as well. It was more commonly called Asplenium ebeneum, a name published by William Aiton in 1789, until the rediscovery and revival of the Linnaean epithet in the late nineteenth century. Several forms and varieties of the species have been described, but few are recognized today; in particular, larger and more fertile specimens, those with more or less toothed leaves, and those with proliferating buds are considered to fall within the natural range of variation of the species, and do not require taxonomic distinction. A. platyneuron f. hortonae, a sterile form with the pinnae cut to toothed pinnules, and f. furcatum, with forking fronds, are still recognized.

The formation of proliferating buds is one of several unusual adaptations for reproduction in this species. The buds form near the base of the stipe, and when covered with soil, can grow into new individuals as the frond that bore them dies. Ebony spleenwort is also well-adapted to propagate by spores: the upright sterile fronds help the spores enter the airstream for long-distance dispersal, and a low genetic load allows spores that have grown into a gametophyte to self-fertilize with a high degree of success. This dispersal ability seems to have helped the species spread rapidly in the Great Lakes region in the late 20th century. Long-distance dispersal may also explain its naturalized appearance in South Africa, and the existence of an isolated population found in Slovakia in 2009, its first known occurrence in Europe.

Ebony spleenwort has broad habitat preferences, growing both on rocks like many other North American spleenworts and in a variety of soils. Unlike many other spleenworts, it is not particularly sensitive to soil pH. It hybridizes with several other spleenworts, particularly mountain spleenwort and walking fern; these species, their sterile hybrid offspring, fertile allotetraploid hybrids, and backcrosses between allotetraploids and the parents are collectively known as the "Appalachian Asplenium complex". Two hybrids between A. platyneuron and spleenworts outside of this complex are also known.

Description
Ebony spleenwort is a small fern with pinnate fronds, growing in tufts, with a shiny reddish-brown stipe and rachis. The fronds are dimorphic, with long, erect, dark green fertile fronds, which are deciduous, and shorter, spreading, lighter green sterile fronds, which are evergreen.

Roots and rhizomes
This fern does not spread and form new plants via the roots.

Leaves
It lacks wings, and is a shiny reddish-brown or blackish-brown throughout its length. Towards the base, it has a few threadlike scales similar in color to those of the rhizome. Starch granules are stored in tissue at the base of the stipe and, to a lesser extent, in the rhizome, giving the bases an enlarged appearance and a firm texture. The stipe bases are long-lived and may survive the disintegration of the rest of the stipe and the blade.

It is acute (pointed) at its tip and gradually tapers at its base. The blade is shiny and has a few scattered hairs, or lacks them entirely. The rachis (leaf axis), like the stipe, is reddish-, purplish- or blackish-brown, shiny and hairless.

The blade is cut into pinnae (leaflets) throughout its length, from 15 to 45 pairs per leaf. The pinnae are distinctly alternate along the rachis. Each pinna has an obvious auricle at its base, pointing towards the tip of the blade and overlapping the rachis. Sometimes a small auricle pointing at the base of the blade is present as well The edges of the pinnae are crenate or serrulate (bearing rounded or small sharp teeth); they are more deeply cut in small forms. The tips of the pinnae may be acute or obtuse (blunt. On the underside of the blade, veins are clearly visible and free (they do not anastomose or rejoin each other). A few minute scales may also be scattered on the underside.

Sori and spores
Each pair of sori forms a chevron, pointing towards the base of the pinna along its midvein, on which they are centered. An indusium covers each sorus; these are whitish and translucent or silvery with a slightly toothed or erose (irregularly jagged) edge, soon withering to reveal the sori. Each sporangium in a sorus carries 64 spores. The diploid sporophyte has a chromosome number of 72.

The light to dark brown spores are monolete, with a straight laesura with a margo (raised border). They are 41 to 52 microns long along their long axis. The perine (outermost layer of the spore) appears spiny, with rough ridges forming a netted pattern. The region of the perine between ridges has a smooth, rather than granular, texture.

Proliferating buds
Ebony spleenwort is capable of proliferating by forming new plantlets from buds on the rachis at the base of the plant. These allow new individuals to form at different levels when prostrate fronds become buried in the leaf litter. Wagner & Johnson found proliferous buds in almost every site in the Great Lakes populations they studied; very rarely did more than one bud per plant occur. They occurred, on average, on 1 out of 6 plants, both on sterile and fertile fronds, and their position at the base of the lowest pinnae made them difficult to find among the cluster of fronds. The buds are button-like, pale in color, and appear on the upper side of the lowest pinnae. Each bud contains a shoot and one or sometimes two leaf primordia, covered in clathrate scales, occasionally with roots if the bud has begun to develop. Contact with soil at the plant base stimulates their development, and the decay of their connection with the parental leaf results in the development of a new plant. Similar buds have also been reported from the single-sorus spleenwort, Asplenium monanthes.

Identification
The species most similar to Asplenium platyneuron is the black-stemmed spleenwort, A. resiliens. However, this stipe of this species is darker, and the pinnae are opposite, rather than alternate, along the rachis. Maidenhair spleenwort, A. trichomanes, is also pinnately cut with a dark, glossy rachis, but the pinnae are oval and somewhat rounded rather than broadly oblong, usually less than two times as long as wide. Neither of these two species, nor the other pinnate American spleenworts, have dimorphic fertile and sterile fronds. It is very similar to Boydston's spleenwort, Asplenium × boydstoniae, an extremely rare backcross with Tutwiler's spleenwort, Asplenium tutwilerae; however, Boydston's spleenwort has an elongated, acute frond tip similar to that of Tutwiler's spleenwort. Among similar South African spleenworts, A. lunulatum has proliferating frond tips, while A. monanthes has only one sorus on each pinna.

Among the larger ferns, A. platyneuron might be confused with a young Christmas fern, Polystichum acrostichoides, but that species is generally much larger and has a green, scaly stipe and rachis. Fishbone fern, Nephrolepis cordifolia, is likewise larger, with yellowish-green pinnae and a green rachis.

Taxonomy
This species is commonly known as "ebony spleenwort" or "brownstem spleenwort" for the dark color of its stipe and rachis.

The basionym for the species is Acrostichum platyneuros, published by Linnaeus in Species Plantarum in 1753 (the official starting point of modern botanical nomenclature). Linnaeus' treatment came from a 1745 dissertation by his student J. B. Heiligtag, which in turn drew on the descriptions by several earlier authorities. The first description listed was that of Jan Gronovius, botanist and mentor of Linnaeus, in his Flora Virginica of 1743, based on a specimen collected by the collector John Clayton. The specific epithet platyneuros ("flat nerves") was drawn from a description by the botanist Leonard Plukenet in his Almagestum of 1696. Unfortunately, only Clayton's specimen, now the lectotype for the species, represents the species now known as Asplenium platyneuron; the specimens upon which the other descriptions are based, including that of Plukenet which yielded the specific epithet, are a mixture of Pleopeltis polypodioides and Polypodium virginianum sensu lato. In 1789, the species was independently described by William Aiton in Hortus Kewensis, and given the name Asplenium ebeneum, referring to the ebony color of its stalk. The species was also independently described by Olof Swartz in 1801, as Asplenium polypodioides, and by André Michaux in 1803 as Asplenium trichomanoides; both these names were reduced to synonymy with Asplenium ebeneum by Carl Ludwig Willdenow. The name Asplenium trichomanoides, however, had already been used by Linnaeus in 1767, making Michaux's name a nomen illegitimum.

It was Aiton's epithet, ebeneum, that was used by American botanists throughout most of the 19th century. The transfer of Linnaeus' specific epithet to form the name Asplenium platyneuron was mooted by D. C. Eaton in 1878, who attributed the combination to a pencil notation by William Oakes in the margin of a copy of Flora Virginica. Therefore, the combination has historically been attributed to Oakes or Oakes ex D.C.Eaton. However, in 1981, David B. Lellinger pointed out that Eaton had not, in fact, accepted the combination in 1878, preferring the more descriptive epithet ebeneum to the less accurate through senior platyneuron. Eaton's use, therefore, was to be treated as provisional, and not as a published combination by him. Eaton aside, the first valid publication of Asplenium platyneuron was that of Britton, Emerson E. Sterns, and Justus F. Poggenburg in 1888, which implicitly references Linnaeus's basionym. Despite the revival of Linnaeus' epithet, the name Asplenium ebeneum continued to be widely used through 1896, when Lucien Underwood, in Britton & Brown's Illustrated Flora, used the name Asplenium platyneuron with explicit reference to the basionym.

The species has twice been placed in genera segregated from Asplenium: as Chamaefilix platyneuros by Oliver A. Farwell in 1931, and as Tarachia platyneura by Sizuo Momose in 1960. Neither combination was widely accepted and current authorities do not recognize these genera.

A global phylogeny of Asplenium published in 2020 divided the genus into eleven clades, which were given informal names pending further taxonomic study. A. platyneuron belongs to the "A. incisum subclade" of the "Schaffneria clade". The Schaffneria clade has a worldwide distribution, and members vary widely in form and habitat. There is no clear morphological feature that has evolved within the A. incisum subclade to define it, but members of the subclade do share a chestnut-brown stipe base. Relationships within the clade are not well-resolved; it includes species from South America, Europe, and China, but no other North American species.

Forms and varieties
Three varieties were recognized by Carl Taylor et al. in 1976 in their treatment of the species: A. platyneuron var. platyneuron, the typical variety, A. platyneuron var. incisum, with more deeply cut pinnae, and A. platyneuron var. bacculum-rubrum, larger and more fertile than the others with toothed pinnae. However, they note that both these varieties intergrade, and Flora of North America does not recognize any infraspecific taxa.  In addition to these varieties, three forms were recognized by Taylor et al. A. platyneuron f. proliferum, discussed below, is not recognized by later treatments. A. platyneuron f. hortonae is only known from sporadic, sterile specimens, with pinnae imbricate and deeply cut and lobed. In A. platyneuron f. furcatum, the rachis is multiply branched near the tip, but the form appears otherwise normal.

Asplenium ebeneum var. bacculum-rubrum was first described in 1871 by Americus Featherman. His epithet refers to Baton Rouge, Louisiana, where he found it growing at the edges of cultivated fields and canebrakes. A large variety of Asplenium platyneuron found throughout the southeastern United States, with distinct rather than confluent sori, was described by M. L. Fernald in 1935 as Asplenium platyneuron var. euroaustrinum, who was then unaware of Featherman's publication. He subsequently deemed the two to be identical, and transferred Featherman's variety to A. platyneuron, as A. platyneuron var. bacculum-rubrum, in 1936. Herb Wagner and David M. Johnson, who collected similar material in Cass County, Michigan (well to the northwest of the supposed range of the variety) did not consider morphological variation in var. bacculum-rubrum to be distinct from typical material except for its size, and recommended it be given taxonomic status no higher than that of a form, if recognized at all.

Asplenium ebeneum var. incisum was collected by Elliot C. Howe in Poestenkill, New York and described in 1869 by Charles H. Peck. Although described as having pinnae largely "incised-pinnatifid", most of the pinnae in the type material are doubly serrate (toothed) or serrate-incised. In 1873, Elihu S. Miller collected fronds from Wading River, New York which were wider than usual and sharply serrate. This he named Asplenium ebeneum var. serratum, at the suggestion of Asa Gray. Although Miller's type material has not been located, specimens determined as var. serratum by Gray were found by Taylor et al. to be indistinguishable from var. incisum. However, both epithets continued to be recognized by authors for some time. Britton, Sterns and Poggenburg transferred var. serratum as A. platyneuron var. serratum in 1888; Willard Clute lowered its rank to become A. ebeneum f. serratum in 1901, and the combination at this rank was transferred to A. platyneuron by Ralph Hoffmann in 1922. Benjamin Lincoln Robinson transferred var. incisum to A. platyneuron in 1908, and Farwell recognized var. serratum when he segregated Chamaefilix from Asplenium in 1931. Edgar T. Wherry, in 1940, synonymized not only var. serratum with var. incisum, but included var. bacculum-rubrum and var. euroaustrinum under that epithet. He also created the epithet var. typicum for the normal form of ebony spleenwort. Taylor et al., reviewing these treatments, distinguished var. incisum as having doubly serrate pinnae cut less than 80% of the way to the costa, with normal fertility (unlike the sterile A. platyneuron f. hortonae). As these plants occur throughout the range of the species intermixed with typical specimens and intergrading with them morphologically, Wagner and Johnson did not think them worth of taxonomic recognition.

Another taxon characterized by deeply incised margins was described in 1901 by George E. Davenport as Asplenium ebeneum var. hortonae. These specimens were found in 1900 growing on limestone in Brattleboro, Vermont by Frances B. Horton, for whom Davenport named the variety. In this variety, all the pinnae (including the more reduced basal pinnae) are obliquely toothed or cut very nearly into separate, toothed pinnules. The upright fronds are sterile. Willard Clute treated it as a form, A. ebeneum f. hortonae, in 1906. B. L. Robinson, in 1908, declared A. ebeneum var. hortonae a synonym of A. platyneuron var. incisum. Clute transferred the epithet at the varietal level to form A. platyneuron var. hortonae in 1909, but he also equated this with var. incisum. Lyman B. Smith continued to recognize it in Massachusetts, treating it as the form A. platyneuron f. hortonae in 1928. In 1937, Arthur Leeds explicitly distinguished it at varietal level, noting that a photograph of the type of A. ebeneum var. incisum did not closely correspond to A. ebeneum var. hortonae, having merely toothed rather than deeply cut and overlapping pinnae. Edgar Wherry also explicitly distinguished A. platyneuron var. hortonae from A. platyneuron var. incisum, erroneously duplicating Clute's 1909 combination. Material collected from St. Mary's County, Maryland was described by James E. Benedict, Jr. in 1947 as A. platyneuron f. dissectum, noting that while similar to f. hortonae, some of the pinnae in his material were completely cut into pinnules, which were themselves deeply lobed. Taylor et al. noted that much of Benedict's material, however, resembled typical f. hortonae, although approaching var. bacculum-rubrum in size. They equated f. dissectum with f. hortonae, and noted that specimens of the latter could approach var. incisum and var. bacculum-rubrum. While Wagner and Johnson declined to distinguish most infraspecific taxa within A. platyneuron, they did recognize f. hortonae as a "rare sterile form".

A form with forked fronds was known around the end of the nineteenth century, and was formally described in 1909 by Willard Clute as A. platyneuron f. furcatum. The form differs from normal A. platyneuron only in forking near the apex of the blade. Robert M. Tetrick II discovered similar plants in West Virginia, which he described as having "fronds much branched, the ultimate divisions crested" and named A. platyneuron f. multifidum. Taylor et al. compared the type of this form with Clute's illustration of f. furcatum and considered them to be the same. Wagner & Johnson noted that such forms were a frequent developmental error in many species of North American fern.

The formation of proliferating buds in ebony spleenwort has also given rise to a taxonomic distinction. Bud formation was first observed by the nurseryman Conrad Loddiges in 1817, in specimens in cultivation in Great Britain. However, the phenomenon was overlooked until 1879, when D. C. Eaton observed it in specimens from Florida. He took this for an aberrant variety, which he named A. ebeneum var. proliferum. Willard Clute reduced its status from a variety to a form, A. ebeneum f. proliferum, in 1906. Similar specimens were subsequently reported from Maryland, Pennsylvania, and Connecticut; the buds appeared on the rachis of sterile fronds, and were often only detected when mounting the specimen. In 1924, Frederick G. Floyd argued that the formation of these proliferations was a normal characteristic of the species, which appeared regularly, if not universally, and did not warrant a varietal designation. He also observed the formation of proliferating buds on a fertile rachis of A. ebeneum var. serratum. Floyd's position was not universally accepted: Louise Tanger made a new combination for the form, A. platyneuron f. proliferum in 1933, and Taylor et al. recognized it in a discussion of infraspecific taxa in the species in 1976. However, these authors noted that specimens of A. platyneuron f. proliferum would be assigned to various other varieties if they were not proliferous. Wagner & Johnson, in 1981, declined to recognize the taxon on grounds similar to Floyd's, and Wagner's treatment in Flora of North America does not mention the form.

Hybrids
As part of the "Appalachian Asplenium complex", ebony spleenwort has been found to form hybrids with a number of other spleenworts. The hybrid with mountain spleenwort (A. montanum) has been collected only rarely, but on multiple occasions, this hybrid has undergone chromosome doubling to give rise to the fertile species known as Bradley's spleenwort (A. bradleyi). A backcross between A. bradleyi and A. platyneuron is believed to have been collected twice, from a now-destroyed site in Pennsylvania, and in a preliminary report from Sequatchie County, Tennessee. The hybrid with walking fern (A. rhizophyllum), known as Scott's spleenwort (A. × ebenoides), regularly appears where the two parent species grow together. At one locality, in Havana Glen, Alabama, A. × ebenoides has undergone chromosome doubling to produce a fertile species, Tutwiler's spleenwort (A. tutwilerae). The backcross between A. platyneuron and A. tutwilerae is known as Boydston's spleenwort (A. × boydstoniae), occurring in nature only with A. tutwilerae at Havana Glen. A. platyneuron is also known to hybridize with lobed spleenwort (A. pinnatifidum), a descendant of mountain spleenwort and walking fern, to produce the rare Kentucky spleenwort (A. × kentuckiense). Evidence for these hybridizations was obtained through cytological studies, chromatography, and allozyme electrophoresis.

Outside of the "Appalachian Asplenium complex", A. platyneuron can also hybridize with wall-rue (A. ruta-muraria), forming Morgan's spleenwort ([[Asplenium × morganii|A. × morganii]]), and with maidenhair spleenwort (A. trichomanes) to form Virginia spleenwort (A. × virginicum). A. × morganii is known from one specimen, collected from a limestone cliff overlooking the Potomac River in Maryland, while A. × virginicum has been collected three times, from Pennsylvania, Virginia, and North Carolina. A hybrid with Asian walking fern, A. ruprechtii, has been produced in cultivation and is informally known as A. × crucibuli in horticulture. It is similar to A. × ebenoides, but the frond is linear in shape, rather than being wider at the base.

Distribution and habitat
In North America, A. platyneuron is native throughout the eastern United States from southern Maine to the southeastern corner of Wisconsin, south to Florida and west to eastern Nebraska, Kansas, Oklahoma, and Texas, and in the far southeast of Canada. It is also found around the meeting point of Colorado, New Mexico, and Oklahoma, and in isolated small populations in New Mexico, Arizona and the West Indies. Outside of North America, A. platyneuron is found in tropical and subtropical southern Africa, a distribution not known for any other North American fern. It ranges from the Western Cape province of South Africa northwards along the eastern seaboard to Gauteng and Mpumalanga provinces, its distribution including Lesotho. An isolated population was found on serpentine soil in an oak woodland in Slovakia in 2009. Since the 1960s, A. platyneuron has spread rapidly and aggressively in the Great Lakes region, where it was formerly uncommon. Unlike many other North American spleenworts, it can grow on soil as well as rock. When growing in soil, it can be found in forests and woodlands, including sandy pinelands, as well as old fields and other disturbed sites. It can colonize a variety of rocks, particularly (but not limited to) calcareous ones, and will also grow on mortared walls. In South Africa, it is generally found at altitudes over 600 meters (2,000 ft), in habitats similar to those it prefers in North America (under small bushes and on rocky banks). It typically occurs neither in full shade nor in full sun, but at the base of rocks in grasslands and at forest edges and in Leucosidea scrub.

Ecology and conservation
Protein extracts from A. platyneuron have been shown to deter insect predation on soybeans to a significant extent, and the Missouri Botanical Garden describes it as lacking "serious insect or disease problems". However, a population of several hundred individuals in Florida was reported to have been almost wiped out by insect activity. It is susceptible to slugs. The black fern aphid (Idiopterus nephrelepidis) has been reported to feed on it.

Sporophytes are fairly tolerant of drought, but require well-drained soils. The prothallia (gametophytes) of A. platyneuron can survive periods of drought for up to a month. There is some evidence to show that the prothallia may undergo clonal reproduction and fission, which has been induced in the laboratory through variations in light intensity.

A variety of adaptations make A. platyneuron an aggressive colonizer, even weedy, when compared with other spleenworts, although a warming climate and an increase in second growth habitats may also have played a role in its expansion in the Great Lakes region. It tolerates broad variation in soil conditions, including pH, and will grow in both sun and shade. The starchy stipe bases provide energy for rapid growth in the spring, allowing the fronds to keep ahead of competing vegetation. The erect fertile fronds, unusual for Asplenium, help release spores into the wind for long-distance dispersal, while the proliferative buds allow clonal propagation in moist, fertile habitats. The species also carries a very low genetic load, so that viable sporophytes can develop from intragametophytic self-fertilization with 83–89% success. This means that new sporophytes can usually grow from the gametophyte formed from a single spore. This has allowed ebony spleenwort to be an early colonizer, from distant locations, of recently disturbed habitats, such as coal spoils in southern Iowa. The appearance of A. platyneuron'' in a disturbed habitat in Slovakia,  from the nearest known sites in eastern North America, is probably the result of long-distance dispersal, which may also have allowed it to colonize and naturalize in South Africa.

While globally secure, ebony spleenwort is considered an endangered species in some of the states and provinces at the northern and western edges of its North American range. NatureServe considers it to be critically imperiled in Arizona and Colorado, imperiled in Nebraska, Maine, Rhode Island, and Quebec, and vulnerable in Minnesota.

Cultivation
The ebony spleenwort is sometimes grown as a terrarium or garden plant. It can be cultivated in sandy peat, subacid garden soil, other gravelly, sandy or gritty soils, or potting mix under moist to dry conditions. Both acid and alkaline soils are acceptable. Good drainage is essential, and the species will grow even in dry soil. Partial sun or low to high light is recommended, although full shade is tolerated. Plants are said to be easy to maintain once they have become established, but it has been described as "rather difficult" to grow in Germany. Conrad Loddiges found it necessary to use artificial heat to cultivate ebony spleenwort in Great Britain.

See also
Asplenium hybrids

Notes and references

Notes

References

Works cited

External links
 Flora of Pennsylvania

platyneuron
Ferns of the United States
Ferns of Canada
Plants described in 1753
Taxa named by Carl Linnaeus